Maleniska  is a village in the administrative district of Gmina Leżajsk, within Leżajsk County, Subcarpathian Voivodeship, in south-eastern Poland.

The village has a population of 900.

References

Villages in Leżajsk County